The National Agricultural Technology Institute, commonly known as INTA, is an Argentine federal extension agency in charge of the generation, adaptation and diffusion of technologies, knowledge and learning procedures for the agriculture, forest and agro-industrial activities within an ecologically clean environment.

Even though the institute, created in 1956, depends on the Secretary of Agriculture, Livestock, Fishing and Food of the Ministry of Economy and Production, it has financial and operative autarkic autonomy given by law 25641/02 that provides the Institute with the 0.5% of the importations.

Activities

The INTA researches and produces information and technologies applied to processes and products, that are later forwarded to the producers. It works, for instance, in the genetic improvement and development of specific properties of diverse cereals, fruits, flowers, forest trees and vegetables, as well as the handling of cultivations and native forests.

Another important field is the sanity of the products; plagues control, weeds and diseases. It studies and researches the harvest, manipulation, packing, distribution and commercialisation of fruit and vegetables, as well as the handling and processing of meats and dairy products. 
The institute also observes market behaviours of internal and external consume, as well as the economical impact of the different applied technologies.

Organization
The INTA has a directive board composed of members of both the official and the private sector; they define the politics at national level. 
The national direction executes the planning of the board, assisted by the organization and administration technical areas.

Research and producers' capacitation takes place in 44 experimental agricultural stations and 240 extension units around the country.

See video about INTA

See also
INTI, the National Industrial Technology Institute of Argentina
Science and technology in Argentina

References

External links
National Agricultural Technology Institute
Ministerio De Ciencia, Tecnología e Innovación productiva de Argentina
Ministerio de Agricultura, Ganadería y Pesca de Argentina

Government agencies of Argentina
Scientific organisations based in Argentina
Agricultural organisations based in Argentina
Forestry education
Government agencies established in 1956
Forestry in Argentina